Anthurium amnicola (syn. Anthurium lilacinum), the tulip anthurium, tulip tailflower, or Hawaiian tulip, is a species of flowering plant in the family Araceae, native to Panama. With its tuliplike flowers it was grown in Hawaii for the cut flower industry, and is occasionally sold today as a houseplant.

References

amnicola
House plants
Endemic flora of Panama
Plants described in 1980